Chaharduli-ye Gharbi Rural District is a rural district (dehestan) in Chaharduli District, Qorveh County, Kurdistan Province, Iran. At the 2006 census, its population was 8,164, in 1,826 families. The rural district has 28 villages.

References 

Rural Districts of Kurdistan Province
Qorveh County